Nikoleta Atanasova Boycheva (Bulgarian: Николета Атанасова Бойчева) (born 20 August 1994) is a Bulgarian football defender currently playing for FC Lokomotiv Stara Zagora.

External links 
 

1994 births
Living people
Bulgarian women's footballers
Bulgaria women's international footballers
Expatriate women's footballers in Germany
Women's association football defenders